Adel Gamal Abdullah Saleh (born 1 January 1993) is a Emirati football player who plays as a midfielder, most recently for Khor Fakkan.

Club career
He made his professional debut in the Segunda Liga for Santa Clara on 19 March 2017 in a game against Braga B.in 2020 he left Khor Fakkan to become a free agent

References

1993 births
Living people
Yemeni footballers
Yemeni expatriate footballers
C.D. Santa Clara players
Sharjah FC players
Khor Fakkan Sports Club players
Expatriate footballers in Portugal
Expatriate footballers in the United Arab Emirates
Yemeni expatriate sportspeople in Portugal
Yemeni expatriate sportspeople in the United Arab Emirates
Liga Portugal 2 players
UAE Pro League players
UAE First Division League players
Place of birth missing (living people)
Association football midfielders